The 1995 UCLA Bruins football team represented the University of California, Los Angeles in the 1995 NCAA Division I-A football season. The team was ranked 16th in the pre-season AP Poll. In the final game of the season, the Bruins lost to the 11th-ranked Kansas Jayhawks in the Aloha Bowl, 51–30.  UCLA finished in a fifth place tie in the Pacific-10 Conference.

Schedule

Roster

Game summaries

Miami (FL)

Aloha Bowl

First quarter scoring: KU—Jim Moore, nine-yard pass from Mark Williams (Jeff McCord converts)

Second quarter scoring: KU—June Henley, 49-yard run. McCord converts; KU—McCord, 27-yard field goal.

Third quarter scoring KU—Henley, two-yard run. McCord kick fails; UCLA—Brad Melsby, eight-yard pass from Cade McNown (Bjorn Merten kick); KU—Isaac Byrd, 77-yard pass from Williams (McCord converts); KU—Andre Carter, 27-yard pass from Williams (McCord converts)

Fourth quarter scoring UCLA—Kevin Jordan, eight-yard pass from McNown (Merten kick); UCLA — Karim Abdul-Jabbar five-yard run (Melsby pass from McNown); KU—Williams, six-yard run (McCord converts); UCLA—Melsby, seven-yard pass from McNown (Abdul-Jabbar run); KU—Eric Vann, 67-yard run (McCord converts)

Running back Karim Abdul-Jabbar was named MVP of the Aloha Bowl.

Awards and honors
 All-Americans: 
 All-Conference First Team:

References

UCLA
UCLA Bruins football seasons
UCLA Bruins football